Jeff Woodard (born December 1, 1964) is an American bobsledder. He competed at the 1992 Winter Olympics and the 1994 Winter Olympics.

References

External links
 

1964 births
Living people
American male bobsledders
Olympic bobsledders of the United States
Bobsledders at the 1992 Winter Olympics
Bobsledders at the 1994 Winter Olympics
Sportspeople from Albany, New York